The following is a complete list of Syracuse Orange men's basketball seasons for Syracuse University.

Year-by-year results
Since playing its first official season in 1898–99, Syracuse ranks sixth in total victories among all NCAA Division I programs and seventh in all-time win percentage among programs with at least 50 years in Division I, with an all-time win–loss record of 2042–931() as of March 30, 2021 (vacated wins included).

  From 1975 to 1982, the Eastern College Athletic Conference (ECAC) organized annual regional end-of-season men's basketball tournaments for independent Division I ECAC member colleges and universities in the Northeastern United States. The winner of each regional tournament was declared the ECAC regional champion for the season and received an automatic bid in the NCAA Division I men's basketball tournament.
  The NCAA vacated 15 wins from the 2004–05 season as a result of the Syracuse athletics scandal.
  The NCAA vacated 23 wins from the 2005–06 season as a result of the Syracuse athletics scandal.
  The NCAA vacated 22 wins from the 2006–07 season as a result of the Syracuse athletics scandal.
  The NCAA vacated 7 wins from the 2010–11 season as a result of the Syracuse athletics scandal.
  The NCAA vacated 34 wins from the 2011–12 season as a result of the Syracuse athletics scandal.
  Boeheim was suspended for nine games during the 2015–16 season, during which Syracuse went 4–5 overall, and 0–3 in conference. So while the team's record was 23–14 overall, 9–9 in conference, Boeheim is credited with 19–9 overall, 9–6 in conference.
  Syracuse's official NCAA record excludes the aforementioned 101 vacated wins, however Syracuse claims all of its NCAA appearances and conference titles from those years.

References 

 
Syracuse
Basketball seasons
Syracuse Orange basketball seasons